, known professionally as , is a Japanese voice actress from Gifu, Gifu Prefecture, Japan. She is affiliated with Production Ace.

Career 
In 2006, she won the Animax public audition and made her debut as voice actress. She has a wide vocal range that plays from young girls and girls to adult women and even boys. Unlike the voice of Sohara Mitsuki in the anime series Heaven's Lost Property that was played for the first time, the local voice is relatively husky and mature.

Her special skill is sword fighting. In addition, she has obtained a senior dressing instructor and a cook license. The Heaven's Lost Property's web radio “Soraoto-Fu-Rin ☆ Love-” started appearing every time from the middle of the program, but was treated as “Guest appearing every time”.

Filmography
Bold denotes leading roles.

Anime
2009
Fight Ippatsu! Jūden-chan!! as Technological development staff A
Heaven's Lost Property as Sohara Mitsuki
The Melancholy of Haruhi Suzumiya as Female elementary student (ep 13)

2010
Omamori Himari as young Yūto Amakawa, female student, newscaster
Heaven's Lost Property: Forte as Sohara Mitsuki

2011
A Dark Rabbit Has Seven Lives as Haruka Shigure
Gosick as Lee (eps 2–3), Maid (ep 21), Mother (ep 23), Nun (eps 16–17), Nurse (ep 19), Student B (eps 1, 4), Villager C (ep 7)
Kore wa Zombie Desu ka? as Kanami Mihara, Nurse (ep 5)
Inazuma Eleven GO as Midori Seto, Reiichi Miyabino
Maken-ki! as Minori Rokujou

2012
Kore wa Zombie Desu ka? of the Dead as Kanami Mihara
Seitokai no Ichizon Lv.2 as Chizuru Akaba

2014
Dai-Shogun – Great Revolution as Kondo Isami
Maken-ki! Two as Minori Rokujo

2015
The Testament of Sister New Devil Burst as Noel

2016
Bungo Stray Dogs as Kirako Haruno

OVA
2010
 Heaven's Lost Property as Sohara Mitsuki

Films
 Heaven's Lost Property the Movie: The Angeloid of Clockwork

Dubbing
 The Birth of a Nation as Nancy Turner (Aunjanue Ellis)
 Taken as Amanda (Katie Cassidy)

References

External links
 

Living people
1984 births
Voice actresses from Gifu Prefecture
Japanese video game actresses
Japanese voice actresses